Morss Homestead/Federal City Homestead is a historic home and farm complex located at Red Falls in Greene County, New York.  The house was built about 1830 and is a Greek Revival style dwelling.  Also on the property is a barn, carriage house and privy.

It was listed on the National Register of Historic Places in 1983.

References

Houses on the National Register of Historic Places in New York (state)
Greek Revival houses in New York (state)
Houses completed in 1820
Houses in Greene County, New York
National Register of Historic Places in Greene County, New York